Denis Golovanov and Yevgeny Kafelnikov were the defending champions but lost in the quarterfinals to Irakli Labadze and Marat Safin.

David Adams and Jared Palmer won in the final 7–6(10–8), 6–3 against Labadze and Safin.

Seeds

  Mahesh Bhupathi /  Nenad Zimonjić (first round)
  David Adams /  Jared Palmer (champions)
  Michael Hill /  Leander Paes (first round)
  Petr Pála /  David Rikl (quarterfinals)

Draw

External links
 2002 St. Petersburg Open Doubles Draw

St. Petersburg Open
2002 ATP Tour
2002 in Russian tennis